Dulac can refer to:

People
 Bill DuLac, American football player
 Catherine Dulac, a professor for molecular biology

 Edmund Dulac, French book illustrator
 Germaine Dulac, French film director and early film theorist
 Henri Dulac, French mathematician

Places
 Dulac, Louisiana, United States

See also
 Duloc, the kingdom formerly ruled by Lord Farquaad in the Shrek film series